William Cairnes (1669 – August 1707) was an Irish politician and merchant.

He was the second son of John Cairnes and his wife Jane Miller, daughter of James Miller. His brothers were Alexander Cairnes and Henry Cairnes. In 1703, Cairnes was elected as Member of Parliament for Newtown Limavady and Belfast, representing the latter constituency in the Irish House of Commons until his death in 1707.

Cairnes died without children and was buried at St Michan's Church in Dublin on 9 August 1707.

References

1670s births
1707 deaths
Irish MPs 1703–1713
Members of the Parliament of Ireland (pre-1801) for County Londonderry constituencies
Members of the Parliament of Ireland (pre-1801) for Belfast